The Liverpool City Cup is an Australian Turf Club Group 3 Thoroughbred quality open handicap horse race for horses aged three years old and older, run over a distance of 1300 metres at Randwick Racecourse, Sydney, Australia in late February or early March. Total prize money for the race is A$200,000.

History
The race has had changes in grade, distance and location. In 1974 the race was run in 2 divisions. The race is held on the same race card as the Group 1 Chipping Norton Stakes.
Prior to 1970 there was an event called the Liverpool Handicap which was raced at a distance of 7 furlongs. In 1969 the race known as the Warwick Farm Autumn Cup was raced in 1970 as the Liverpool City Cup.

Distance
 1970 -  miles (~2400 metres)
 1971–1972 - 7 furlongs (~1400 metres)
 1973–1978 - 1400 metres
 1979–2007 - 1200 metres
 2008 onwards - 1300 metres

Grade
 1970–1978 - Principal Race
 1979 onwards - Group 3

Venue
 1979 - Warwick Farm Racecourse
 1980–1981 - Randwick Racecourse
 1982–2000 - Warwick Farm Racecourse
 2001 - Randwick Racecourse
 2002–2007 - Warwick Farm Racecourse
 2008–2009 - Randwick Racecourse
 2010–2015 - Warwick Farm Racecourse
 2016 onwards - Randwick Racecourse

Winners

 2023 - Think About It 
 2022 - Ellsberg  
 2021 - Think It Over 
2020 - Quackerjack 
2019 - Dreamforce 
2018 - Crack Me Up
2017 - McCreery
2016 - Charlie Boy 
 2015 - It's Somewhat 
 2014 - Terravista
 2013 - Skyerush
 2012 - Ofcourseican
 2011 - Triple Elegance
 2010 - Dreamscape
 2009 - Judged
 2008 - Danleigh
 2007 - The Free Stater
 2006 - Utzon
 2005 - Sam Sung a Song
 2004 - Carael Boy
 2003 - Planchet
 2002 - Bomber Bill
 2001 - Continuum
 2000 - Catatonic
 1999 - Return To Go
 1998 - Monopolize
 1997 - Accomplice
 1996 - Chlorophyll
 1995 - So Keen
 1994 - Silver Flyer
 1993 - Pharaoh
 1992 - All Archie
 1991 - All Archie
 1990 - Boasting
 1989 - Boasting
 1988 - Breakfast Creek
 1987 - Ma Chiquita
 1986 - Satin Sand
 1985 - Gunyatti
 1984 - Seeker's Gold
 1983 - Rubens
 1982   -   Kalina
 1981   -   Arbogast
 1980   -   Le De'Jeuner
 1979   -   Lady Archon
 1978   -   Sabre Prince
 1977   -   Burwana
 1976   -   Wave King
 1975   -   Gilt Patten
 1974   -   †Toltrice / Itchy Feet
 1973   -   Lord Nelson
 1972   -   Zambari
 1971   -   Abdul
 1970   -   Blue Plume 

† Race run in two divisions

See also
 List of Australian Group races
 Group races

References

External links 
First three placegetters Liverpool City Cup (ATC)

Horse races in Australia